Bernard E. Peters (1893-1949) was an American artist and co founder of the Ste. Genevieve Art Colony.

Biography
Peters was born on August 8, 1893 in St. Louis, Missouri. He studied at the University of Missouri and Harvard University. He taught art at Cleveland High School in St. Louis. He was married to Ord Peters.

At the suggestion of his friend Frank Nuderscher, visited rural Ste. Genevieve, Missouri in 1932. He and Jessie Beard Rickly, along with their families rented a house at 202 Merchant Street, sharing studio space which became the Ste. Genevieve Art Colony. The third co founder of the colony was Aimee Schweig.  The following year the Peters settled in nearby St. Mary, Missouri. Peters was a member of the St. Louis Artists' Guild, the St. Louis Industrial Art Club, and the Two-by-Four Society.

Peters died of Bright's disease on May 21, 1949 in Saint Louis, Missouri at the age of 53.

His work is in the collection of Midwestern art at the St. Louis University High School.

References

External links
 
images of Peters' work on Invaluable

1893 births
1949 deaths
People from St. Louis
Artists from Missouri
American male artists